Ryan Kyle Coogler (born May 23, 1986) is an American filmmaker. He is a recipient of four NAACP Image Awards, four Black Reel Awards, a Golden Globe Award nomination, and two Academy Award nominations.

He made his feature-length debut with the independent film Fruitvale Station (2013), which won the Grand Jury Prize and the Audience Award for U.S. dramatic film at the 2013 Sundance Film Festival. It also won at the 2013 Cannes Film Festival, for Best First Film.

He has since co-written and directed films such as the Rocky series spinoff, Creed (2015), and the Marvel film Black Panther (2018), the latter of which broke numerous box office records and became the highest-grossing film of all time by an African American director. Coogler also co-wrote and directed its sequel Black Panther: Wakanda Forever (2022).

Coogler's films have received widespread acclaim and commercial success.  His work has been hailed by critics for centering on often overlooked cultures and characters—most notably African Americans. He frequently collaborates with actor Michael B. Jordan, who appeared in all four feature films directed by Coogler, as well as composer Ludwig Göransson, who has scored all of his films.

In 2013, he was included on Time's list of the 30 people under 30 who are changing the world. In 2018, Coogler was named the runner-up of Time's Person of the Year and he was included in the annual Time 100 list of the most influential people in the world. In 2021, Coogler, his wife, Zinzi Coogler, and Sev Ohanian founded multimedia company Proximity Media to create event-driven content across various platforms.

Early life 
Coogler was born on May 23, 1986, in Oakland, California. His mother, Joselyn (née Thomas),
is a community organizer, and his father, Ira Coogler, is a juvenile hall probation counselor. Both parents graduated from California State University, Hayward. He has two brothers, Noah and Keenan. His uncle, Clarence Thomas, is a third-generation Oakland longshoreman, and the former secretary treasurer of the International Longshore and Warehouse Union.

Coogler lived in Oakland until age eight, when the family moved to Richmond, California.
During his youth, he ran track and played football. He went to a private Catholic high school, Saint Mary's College High School in Berkeley, California, and did well in math and science.

Coogler attended Saint Mary's College of California in Moraga, California on a football scholarship as a redshirt wide receiver his college freshman semester, intending to major in chemistry. The football players were encouraged to take a
creative writing course. Coogler's teacher praised his work, noting that it was very visual, and encouraged him to learn  screenwriting. As a student athlete  coming up in the Bay Area, Coogler befriended and often played against NFL running back Marshawn Lynch.

After Saint Mary's canceled its football program in March 2004, Coogler transferred and earned a  scholarship to Sacramento State, where he had 112 receptions for 1,213 yards and 6 touchdowns during his four years playing football. At Sacramento, he obtained a bachelor's degree in finance and also took as many film classes as he could fit in with the rigors of college football. Following graduation, he was accepted into the highly competitive three-year master's program at the USC School of Cinematic Arts, where he made a series of short films.

Career

2000s: Early career 
While at the USC School of Cinematic Arts, Coogler directed four short films, three of which won or were nominated for various awards. Locks (2009) screened at the Tribeca Film Festival and won the Dana and Albert Broccoli Award for Filmmaking Excellence. Fig (2011), written by Alex George Pickering, won the HBO Short Film Competition at the American Black Film Festival, the DGA Student Film Award, and was nominated for Outstanding Independent Short Film at the Black Reel Awards. Gap (2011), written by Carol S. Lashof, won the Jack Nicholson Award for Achievement in Directing.

2013: Breakthrough 
 In 2013, Coogler wrote and directed his first feature-length film, Fruitvale Station (originally titled Fruitvale), which told the story of the last 24 hours of the life of Oscar Grant (played by Michael B. Jordan), who was shot to death by a police officer at Oakland's Fruitvale BART station on January 1, 2009. Produced by Oscar-winning actor Forest Whitaker, the film premiered at the 2013 Sundance Film Festival, where it won the top Audience Award and Grand Jury Prize in the dramatic competition and was released in theatres on July 20, 2013. Made on a budget of $900,000, the film grossed over $17 million worldwide after its theatrical run. 

Peter Travers of Rolling Stone called the film "a gut punch of a movie" and "an unstoppable cinematic force". A. O. Scott of The New York Times wrote that Coogler's "hand-held shooting style evokes the spiritually alert naturalism of Jean-Pierre and Luc Dardenne". Todd McCarthy of The Hollywood Reporter called it "a compelling debut" and "a powerful dramatic feature film". On Rotten Tomatoes, the film received a score of 94% based on 195 reviews, with a critical consensus that reads: "Passionate and powerfully acted, Fruitvale Station serves as a celebration of life, a condemnation of death, and a triumph for star Michael B. Jordan." The film appeared on several critics' top ten lists of the best films of 2013.

2015: Creed, Expansion into blockbusters 
In 2015, Coogler released his second film, Creed, a spin-off of the Rocky films, which Coogler directed and co-wrote with Aaron Covington. The film starred Michael B. Jordan as Apollo Creed's son Donnie, who is trained and mentored by his father's old friend and former rival Rocky Balboa, played by Sylvester Stallone. It received critical acclaim from critics and audiences and grossed over $173 million worldwide. Among its accolades, Stallone won the National Board of Review Award for Best Supporting Actor, the Critics' Choice Movie Award for Best Supporting Actor, and Golden Globe Award for Best Supporting Actor - Motion Picture, and was nominated for the Academy Award for Best Supporting Actor.

2018: Black Panther, established career 

In 2018, Coogler co-wrote and directed the Marvel film Black Panther, making him the first black Marvel Studios   director. The film starred Chadwick Boseman as the titular character, who is crowned king of Wakanda following his father's death, but is challenged by his cousin, Erik Killmonger (played by Michael B. Jordan), who plans to abandon the country's isolationist policies and begin a global revolution.

Upon release, the film grossed $1.3 billion worldwide and broke numerous box office records, becoming the highest-grossing film directed by a Black filmmaker, the ninth-highest-grossing film of all time and the second-highest-grossing film of 2018. Black Panther was also a critical success. Rotten Tomatoes' critical consensus reads, "Black Panther elevates superhero cinema to thrilling new heights while telling one of the MCU's most absorbing stories—and introducing some of its most fully realized characters." The film was also noted for its representation of black people and subject matter related to Afrofuturism.

The film was nominated for seven awards at the 91st Academy Awards, winning three, and received numerous other accolades. Black Panther is the first superhero film to receive an Academy Award nomination for Best Picture, and the first MCU film to win several categories (those being for Best Costume Design, Best Production Design and Best Original Score).

2020s: Continued success 
In 2021, Coogler served as a co-producer alongside Charles D. King and Shaka King on the Fred Hampton biopic Judas and the Black Messiah, directed by Shaka King, which focused on the betrayal of Hampton (played by Daniel Kaluuya), chairman of the Illinois chapter of the Black Panther Party in late-1960s Chicago, by William O'Neal (played by LaKeith Stanfield).

The film received critical acclaim and earned Coogler, Shaka King and Charles D. King an Academy Award nomination for Best Picture, the first for an all-black producing team. Judas and the Black Messiah earned five other Oscar nominations at the 93rd Academy Awards, including Best Supporting Actor for both Daniel Kaluuya and LaKeith Stanfield, and won Best Supporting Actor for Kaluuya and Best Original Song ("Fight for You"). For his performance as Hampton, Kaluuya also won Best Supporting Actor at the Golden Globes, Critics' Choice Awards, Screen Actors Guild Awards, and BAFTA Awards.

That same year, Coogler served as co-producer on the Space Jam sequel Space Jam: A New Legacy, starring LeBron James. The film received generally mixed-to-negative reviews and was a financial failure, grossing $163.7 million worldwide on a budget of $150 million.

Coogler served as co-writer and director on the Black Panther sequel, Black Panther: Wakanda Forever, which was released in the United States on November 11, 2022.

Other works and future projects 
Coogler served as an executive producer on the ESPN 30 for 30 film The Day the Series Stopped, about Game Three of the 1989 World Series between the San Francisco Giants and the Oakland Athletics, when an earthquake shook the Bay Area to its core.

In January 2013, Coogler said he was working on a graphic novel and young adult novel about an undisclosed subject matter.

Coogler will work with Jordan for a fifth time in the upcoming film Wrong Answer, based on the Atlanta Public Schools cheating scandal.

Coogler served as an executive producer on Creed II, and has written the story outline for the upcoming Creed III.

In February 2021, Coogler's production company Proximity Media signed an exclusive five-year deal with Disney to produce content for them, which includes a Disney+ television series based in Black Panther's home country of Wakanda. Proximity will also co-produce the Marvel series Ironheart for the streaming service; star Dominique Thorne will debut as the titular character in Wakanda Forever. More recently, former HBO executive Kalia Booker had joined the television arm of Proximity Media.

Personal life 
Coogler has worked since age 21 as a counselor with incarcerated youth at San Francisco's Juvenile Hall, following in the footsteps of his father, who has long shared the same occupation. Coogler is also a founding member and supporter of the Blackout For Human Rights campaign, which is committed to addressing racial and human rights violations happening throughout the United States.

Coogler married Zinzi Evans in 2016, with whom he has two children.

In January 2022, Coogler was wrongly targeted as a bank robber and detained by the police in Atlanta, Georgia, after he tried to withdraw cash in the local branch of the Bank of America. Once his identity was verified with both his California state ID card and his Bank of America card, Coogler was released and the bank issued an apology statement. According to a number of sources, the bank's employee did not check Coogler's ID to verify if he was the owner of the bank account.

Filmography

Short films

Feature films 

Producer
 Judas and the Black Messiah (2021)
 Space Jam: A New Legacy (2021)
 Creed III (2023)

Executive producer
 Creed II (2018)
 Homeroom (2021)

Television

Other credits

Awards and nominations

References

External links 
 
 
 

1986 births
Action film directors
African-American film directors
African-American film producers
African-American screenwriters
American feminists
American male screenwriters
Screenwriters from California
California State University, Sacramento alumni
Film directors from California
Film producers from California
Living people
Male feminists
Sacramento State Hornets football players
Saint Mary's College of California alumni
USC School of Cinematic Arts alumni
Writers from Oakland, California
21st-century African-American people
20th-century African-American people
African-American male writers